Niagara Automobile Company was an American automobile manufacturer in Buffalo, New York in 1915 and 1916.

Other American automobile manufacturers that used the brand name Niagara were Niagara Automobile Company (1901) and Niagara Motor Vehicle Company, both of which had minimal, if any production.  Wilson Automobile Company, used the brand Niagara and Niagara Motor Car Corporation called their automobile Lad's Car.

History 
The company was founded in 1915 in Buffalo, New York. It was a merger of Mutual Motor Car Company and Buffalo's largest automobile dealer, Poppenberg Motor Company.  Production was contracted to Crow-Elkhart in Elkhart, Indiana. The name of the brand was Niagara with Four added to the name on some advertising.

One model, C-16 was made with a four-cylinder engine made by Lycoming.  Touring cars and Roadsters were marketed both priced at $740, .  Production ended in 1916 after about 500 automobiles were produced.

References 

Defunct motor vehicle manufacturers of the United States
1915 establishments in New York (state)
1916 disestablishments in New York (state)
American companies disestablished in 1916
American companies established in 1915
Brass Era vehicles
1910s cars
Motor vehicle manufacturers based in New York (state)
Cars introduced in 1915
Vehicle manufacturing companies established in 1915
Vehicle manufacturing companies disestablished in 1916